Nyaaringu is the debut studio album by Australian singer and songwriter Miiesha, released digitally on 29 May 2020. Following its physical release in August 2020, the album peaked at number 28 on the ARIA charts.

Speaking about the album, Miiesha said "Nyaaringu is a collection of stories that I feel I wanted to tell or that I needed to speak on. For me it represents my journey and where I'm at now coming from Woorabinda. The interludes in the collection are recordings of my Grandmother speaking. For me she was and always will stay with me as the strongest voice in my life, so I felt she had to be a part of this with me." Nyaaringu is a phrase meaning "what happened" in the Pitjantjatjara language.

At the National Indigenous Music Awards 2020, the album was nominated for Album of the Year. At the 2020 ARIA Music Awards it won Best Soul/R&B Release.

Critical reception

Ali Shutler from NME said "Nyaaringu [is] a fearless debut album that weaves a story about the Indigenous experience", calling it "A soulful R&B record whose tales of discrimination, empowerment and freedom bear relevance well beyond Australia's borders." The Music AU called the album "thematically and communally, powerful."

Tyler Jenke from ToneDeaf said "Arguably one of the strongest debuts in recent memory, and one of the most fitting records to be released during Reconciliation Week, Nyaaringu sees Miiesha Young sharing her story in the way only she can, with a dazzling blend of smooth soulful vocals serving as a statement of self-belief." Geordie Gray from ToneDeaf called Nyaaringu "essential listening", saying "Miiesha deftly weaves stories of community, survival and inherited knowledge. A pivotal masterpiece and an ode to resilience. A heartbreakingly timely debut."

Laura English from Music Feeds called the album "absolutely stunning but the collection of songs goes deeper, exploring the themes of cultural identity and community."

Al Newstead from Triple J said "Miiesha's debut release is one every Australian should hear... Weaving intensely personal and honest storytelling with the kind of warm production SZA or Solange would kill for, Miiesha captures the complexity of the individual Indigenous experience through universally appealing songs."

Simon Winkler from Stack Magazine said the album "...draws upon gospel, R&B, hip hop, soul and spoken word poetry to create something unique, universal and profoundly personal."

Track listing

Charts

Release history

References

2020 debut albums
Miiesha albums
EMI Records albums
ARIA Award-winning albums
Self-released albums